General elections were held in Lebanon between 12 June and 2 July 1960. Independent candidates won the majority of seats. Voter turnout was 50.7%.

Results

References

Lebanon
1960 in Lebanon
Elections in Lebanon
Election and referendum articles with incomplete results